XHDRBZ (stylized as XHDЯBZ, a wordplay for "XH", a Mexican radio and television satellite code, and "DRBZ", consonants of Eugenio Derbez' last name) is a Mexican sitcom (sometimes surreal comedy) produced by Televisa and broadcast by the Canal de las Estrellas network. XHDRBZ emulated a television channel that broadcasts sketches, not unlike the Canadian sketch show SCTV. When a sketch finished, credits were shown, like in a real television program. XHDЯBZ was created by Derbez in 2002, and the series marked his debut as a producer.

The show ran for two seasons from 2002 to 2004. Derbez ended production, choosing to expand one of the show's most popular segments, La Familia P.Luche, into its own half-hour-long show. Both shows are broadcast in the United States on the Galavisión network. Today the show is transmitted in Latin America and Europe.

Format 
The show emulated a TV channel. When the show began, the screen showed a notification saying that Televisa handed over the transmission to XHDRBZ. The show began with an introduction assimilating that of a Newscast. Each sketch is then presented as if it were a different show; at the end of each sketch showed its cast and credits. When the actual show finished, it would present a notification that said Televisa would return to its usual broadcast.

Musical theme 
In 2002, the musical theme was interpreted by Gerardo Suárez and the music was produced by Suite Sync; in 2004 it was produced by Sensaciones Sónicas, and in 2004 Galilea Montijo took care of the choreography.

Guests 
Some of the many guests who have appeared on the show: 
 Silvia Derbez
 Galilea Montijo
 Adela Micha
 Andrea Legarreta
 Leticia Calderón
 Brozo
 Héctor Suárez
 Pedro Armendáriz Jr.
 Omar Chaparro
 Silvia Pinal
 Victoria Ruffo and Gabriela Ruffo
 Adal Ramones
 Vicente Fox (President of Mexico at the time of the show)
 Cuauhtémoc Blanco
 Marco Antonio Regil
 Joaquín López Doriga
 Kate del Castillo
 Antonio de Valdez
 Enrique el "Perro" Bermúdez
 Alejandra Guzmán
 Cristina Saralegui
 Xavier Lopez Chabelo
 Amador Narcia
 Enrique Rocha
 Furcio
 Amira
 Lupita D'Alessio
 Sergio Corona
 Enrique Bermundes
 Jacobo Zabludovsky
 Jose Luis Cuevas
 Ernesto Alonoso
 Chespirito

Sketches

Shows 
These are some of the shows featured in XHDRBZ. Most of the titles of these are a word game in Spanish, thus it might not make sense with the translation. Title in Spanish provided in brackets.

 The mrazy conk (El Lonje Moco), a crazy monk who reads letters from an audience
 Filming (Peliculeando), an actor who shows his latest projects (videos that are the "true definition" of movies; for example, a car screeching is supposed to be "Shreeeeeeek" (Shrek), and a camper peeing on a campfire is supposed to be "Missipippi En Llamas" (Mississippi In Flames); "Missipippi" is an alternate spelling of "me hice pipi", which means, "I peed, or urinated".)
 Top 3 (Top 3 del Momento)
 Someone explain this to me! (¡Que alguien me explique!), Eugenio Derbez plays Hans Pujenhaimer, a German studying Spanish in Mexico, but can't seem to comprehend certain Spanish phrases
 Five incoherences (Las cincoherencias -wordplay)
 Medical cases of real life (Medicazos de la vida real) (wordplay, and reference to long-running anthology telenovela Mujer, casos de la vida real)
 Speaking White (Hablemos Blanco), A sketch in which Eugenio attempts to tell a story without vulgar language. He often says a sentence with a brief pause, showing a prop simulating the vulgar term, then says something completely different.
 Section Impossible (Sección Imposible), Sammy Perez and Miguel Luis interview people over holidays- or the city of Acapulco in one episode- with humorous results from their blunders. It uses "unintentional humor" as it is unscripted.
 (Calzón que me toquen bailo)
 The little devil (El diablito), Eugenio Derbez plays a devil who makes people fall, trip, or slip (usually funny videos similar to those found on America's Funniest Home Videos) by pushing a big button
 Eugenialities (Eugenialidades - word play)
 Furxhio (bloopers)
 The X Files (Los expedientes X)
 The Macabre hour (La hora Macabrona), word play and hidden usage of the Spanish swear word "cabrón"
 Eloy Gameno ("El Oigame No") (The "Excuse Me, No" - word play), a flimsy guy who gets into wordplay arguments and ends up getting choked by the other person
 Merylin Menshow (Marylin Manson), satire and word play
 100 unemployed people said.. (100 mexicans said, 100 desempleados dijeron), (TV game show, a parody of Family Feud) - satire)
 Alz and Heimer (Alz y Heimer) (word play with Alzheimer), An elderly couple with hearing issues who tell anecdotes that are misinterpreted by one another.
 XHDRBZ commercials (satire commercials)
 Lifestyles (Estilos de vida)
 Talks of love and trust (Pláticas de amor y confianza)
 Super Goalkeeper (Super Portero), A goalkeeper who tries to stop others from using sexual innuendo or words similar to brand names in tv to prevent copyright issues.
 Cooking with Mr. Pepe Roni (Cocinando con Don Pepe Roni) (word play with Pepperoni) A segment with an eccentric chef who uses puns and wordplay to cook strange variants of meals.
 The Plush Family (La familia P. Luche), a comedy tv show which would later become a spinoff of XHDRBZ.
 Adventures of Agent D. Zent (Las aventuras del Agente D. Zente - word play)
 Ask me (Pregunteme)
 (Armando Hoyos) (word play with putting holes together) An etymology professor translating words bit-by-bit in a very literal way. He also shares "philosophical" ideas based on pop culture.
 Aderberaz reports (Reportajes de Aberberaz)
 (Sin To Ni Zon)
 Cooking with Tony (Cocinando con Toño)
 The Stroll around everywhere (La Paz Sea Por Todas Partes) (wordplay also meaning Peace Be Everywhere when pronounced as such), A segment meant to teach others about peace, love, and anger management hosted by the guru Nicolas Tranquilino. He always spirals into a rage because of his blundering production team. He is Eugenio's most violent and foul-mouthed character.

Soap operas 
XHDRBZ broadcast certain soap operas, usually satires of real Mexican ones, including:-

 One of wolves (Una de lobos - Cuna de lobos (soap opera) satire)
 Bread-baker school (Escuela de panaderos)
 Suspicion (La sospecha)
 Trace of the past (El rastro del pasado)
 Between love and hate (Entre el amor y el odio)
 Mary from the neighbourhood (María la del Barrio- satire)

Short stories 
Satire of classic short stories, novels, etc.

 Peter Pun (satire of Peter Pan, closest meaning: Peter Fart)
 Betty la feya y la bestia (satire, mix of "Beauty and the Beast" and "Ugly Betty")
 Romero y Chulieta (satire of Romeo and Juliet, closest meaning: Rosemary and Chop)
 Blanca Nueves (satire of Snow White meaning White Nines, wordplay on Nieves meaning snow)

Special broadcasts 

 The best of the 2002 FIFA World Cup (Lo Mejor del mundial 2002) - Feature transmission during the 2002 Korea-Japan Worldcup.
 XHDRBZ First (Primer XHDRBZ)- Transmits various TV celebrities mentioning the XHDRBZ sketches they appeared in. 
 XHDRBZ Last (Último XHDRBZ) - Transmission where the producer communicates through a sketch that the show will cease transmitting for a period of time.

Mexican television sitcoms